Easter Is Cancelled is the sixth studio album by the British hard rock band the Darkness. It was released on 4 October 2019 through Canary Dwarf and Cooking Vinyl.

Background
The album was first announced on 4 April 2019, via a video published on the band's official YouTube channel, featuring the band members reciting a poem. A few days later they also announced details of a UK headline tour to support the album. The first single from the album, "Rock and Roll Deserves to Die", was released on 6 August 2019, along with an accompanying music video.

Critical reception

The album received generally favourable reviews.

Track listing
 "Rock and Roll Deserves to Die" – 5:23 
 "How Can I Lose Your Love" – 3:02 
 "Live 'Til I Die" – 3:32
 "Heart Explodes" – 3:47
 "Deck Chair" – 2:24
 "Easter Is Cancelled" – 4:18
 "Heavy Metal Lover" – 4:41
 "In Another Life" – 4:01
 "Choke on It" – 3:21
 "We Are the Guitar Men" – 4:21

Deluxe edition bonus tracks
<li> "Laylow" – 3:23
<li> "Different Eyes" – 2:51
<li> "Confirmation Bias" – 4:35
<li> "Sutton Hoo" – 3:27

Japanese Edition bonus track
<li> "Dancing House" – 1:05

Personnel
Justin Hawkins – vocals, guitars, piano
Dan Hawkins – guitars, backing vocals
Frankie Poullain – bass, backing vocals
Rufus Tiger Taylor – drums, backing vocals

Charts

References

2019 albums
Cooking Vinyl albums
The Darkness (band) albums